The Stikine Icecap (sometimes referred to as the Stikine Icefield) is a large icefield straddled on the Alaska–British Columbia boundary in the Alaska Panhandle region. It lies in the Boundary Ranges of the Coast Mountains.  Within the United States, most of it is under the administration of the Tongass National Forest and is part of MENthe Stikine-LeConte Wilderness within the national forest.

A good size icefield, the icecap is a primary source for both the Taku River, which forms its northern boundary, and the Taku's southern tributaries, and also the Stikine River and its lower western tributaries, notably the Chutine, which form its southern and southwestern boundary, respectively. The Stikine Icecap is the parent icefield of the LeConte and Sawyer Glaciers on its US side, and the Great Glacier on its Canadian side.  Also on the Canadian side and entering the lower Stikine, like the Great Glacier, are the Mud and Flood Glaciers, which form the boundaries of the small Boundary Range, which is an eastern abutment of the range comprising the Stikine Icecap and marks the approximate boundary claimed by the United States prior to the Alaska Boundary Settlement of 1903.

The Stikine Icecap area is also renowned for its technically demanding and dangerous peaks and spires of granite that have garnered comparisons as North America's version of Patagonia. Peaks of particular renown include Devils Thumb, Witches Tits, Cat's Ears, and the Burkett Needle.

Cited references

See also
Juneau Icefield
List of glaciers and icefields

External links
Bivouac.com writeup

Ice fields of Alaska
Boundary Ranges
Stikine Country
Glaciers of Hoonah–Angoon Census Area, Alaska
Bodies of ice of Petersburg Borough, Alaska
Ice fields of British Columbia
Canada–United States border
Bodies of ice of Unorganized Borough, Alaska